Khai Si is a sub-district (tambon) in Mueang Bueng Kan District, in Bueng Kan Province, northeastern Thailand. As of 2012, it had a population of 5,294 people. It lies on Highway 212 and the Mekong River and border with Laos, west of Bueng Kan and east of Ho Kham.

History
The sub-district was created in 1979, when nine administrative villages were split from Nong Sawang Sub-district (then still named Nong Kheng) to form the new sub-district.

Administration
The sub-district is divided into 10 administrative villages (mubans). The sub-district municipality Khai Si is the local government unit responsible for the sub-district, covering the whole of the sub-district.

References

External links
ThaiTambon.com

Tambon of Bueng Kan province
Populated places in Bueng Kan province
Populated places on the Mekong River